The Château d'Ouchy (Castle of Ouchy) is a hotel built on the site of an old medieval castle in Lausanne, Switzerland by :fr:Jean-Jacques Mercier between 1889 and 1893. 

It belongs to hotel division of the Sandoz Family Foundation.

History 

It was first constructed by the Bishop of Lausanne as a tower on the banks of Lake Léman around 1170. A century later, it was rebuilt and transformed into a fortified residence for bishops, particularly for Guillaume de Varax. It was also used as prison. The castle was abandoned and its tower reduced to ashes in 1609. The canton of Vaud recovered it after the departure of the Berneses and sold off part of the land to Jean-Jacques Mercier in 1885. The new owner radically transformed the castle by demolishing the ruins and old buildings, leaving only the tower.

The castle was rebuilt in the neo-gothic style between 1889 and 1893 and converted into a hotel.

According to J C Grew many of the leading figures of the Treaty of Lausanne were staying at the hotel and there is a plaque of the 1923 Treaty of Lausanne at Chateau d'Ouchy commemorating the peace treaty.

Notes et references

External links 
 
 

Hotels in Switzerland
Buildings and structures in Lausanne
Castles in Vaud